This is the progression of world record improvements of the 400 metres W35 division of Masters athletics.

Key

References

Masters Athletics 400 m list
Women's all time 400 list

Masters athletics world record progressions